The Callanish X stone circle (or "Na Dromannan", "Druim Nan Eun") is one of many megalithic structures around the more well-known and larger Calanais I on the west coast of the isle of Lewis, in the Western Isles of the Outer Hebrides, Scotland.

External links
 Calanais Excavations - Na Dromannan 

 

Archaeological sites in the Outer Hebrides
Isle of Lewis
Scheduled monuments in Scotland